Old Colony has the following meanings:

Plymouth Colony in Massachusetts
Old Colony Historical Society in Taunton, Massachusetts
Old Colony Housing Project in Boston, Massachusetts
Old Colony League, a high school athletic conference in Massachusetts
Old Colony Memorial, a weekly newspaper based in Plymouth, Massachusetts
Old Colony Railroad in southeastern Massachusetts
Old Colony Lines (MBTA), branches of the MBTA commuter rail system in Massachusetts
Old Colony Regional Vocational Technical High School, a full-time, Regional Vocational Technical High School in Rochester, Massachusetts 
Old Colony (bakery), a cookie company in Lake Bluff, Illinois
Old Colony (soft drink), a soft drink in Puerto Rico
Old Colony Mennonites, a Mennonite group, many of which live across North America
Old Colony Trust Co. v. Commissioner, a United States Supreme Court income tax decision